Akl is a common Arabic name (written as  in Arabic). Notable people with the name include:

Given name
Akl Awit (born 1952), Lebanese academic

Surname
Georges Akl, Lebanese painter
Said Akl (1911–2014), also Said Aql, Saeed Akl, Lebanese writer
Selim Akl (born 1948), computing academic

See also
AKL (disambiguation)